= Afra Mall =

Afra Shopping Mall
- Location: Khartoum, Sudan
- Coordinates: 15.5594°N 32.5549°E
- Opened: January 2004
- Manager: Bullary LLC
- Owner: MZK
- Num. of stores: 100
- Floor area: 480,000 square feet (45,000 m^{2})
- Floors: 3 floors
- Parking: 380 places
- Website: www.afrasd.com

Afra Mall (Arabic: مركز عفراء التجاري) was a shopping mall in Khartoum, Sudan. It opened in 2004 and was the first shopping mall in the country.

The mall was two stories and had an area of 45,000 square metres (480,000 sq ft). It contains a hypermarket, a movie theater, an ice-skating rink, an internet cafe, a food court, currency exchanges, and a variety of shops.

== History ==
A substantial portion of the shopping center burned in early May 2012; the mall was subsequently renovated.

During the early weeks of the Sudanese civil war (2023–present), the mall's stores were subject to heavy looting and destruction, including luxury goods, phones, and electronics. The mall was later engulfed in a fire and destroyed by shelling, with the RSF and SAF claiming that the other side had destroyed it.
